The New South Wales cricket team toured New Zealand from January to February 1894 and played seven first-class matches and one minor match. The tour is notable for the fact that the game against New Zealand was New Zealand's first first-class match. The tour was New South Wales' second of New Zealand after a tour in 1890. Like the previous tour it was privately organised by Coleman Davis and not officially sanctioned by the New South Wales Cricket Association. Despite this, given the touring party consisted of leading players from Sydney clubs the team is considered to have been a representative quality side and the matches played on tour to have been official New South Wales first-class games.

Team
The following players were selected for the tour:

Tour

First-class matches

Minor matches

Match summaries

New South Wales vs Auckland

New South Wales vs Hawke's Bay

New South Wales vs Wellington

New South Wales vs Canterbury

New South Wales vs Otago

New South Wales vs New Zealand

New South Wales vs North Island

Statistics (first-class matches)

Batting

Bowling

References

External links 
 New South Wales in New Zealand at ESPNCricinfo

New Zealand cricket seasons from 1890–91 to 1917–18
New South Wales representative sports teams
Cricket in New South Wales